Henry Richard Schenker (April 21, 1882 – May 3, 1922) was an American football and baseball coach. He served as the head football coach at the University of Texas at Austin in 1906 and at Mercer University in 1907, compiling a career college football record of 12–4. Schenker was also the head baseball coach at Texas in the spring of 1907, tallying a mark of 16–8.

Schenker was born on April 21, 1882 in Holyoke, Massachusetts. He graduated from Yale University in 1905. He died on May 3, 1922 in Minneapolis, Minnesota after suffering from liver cancer.

Head coaching record

Football

Baseball

References

External links
 

1882 births
1922 deaths
Mercer Bears football coaches
Texas Longhorns football coaches
Texas Longhorns baseball coaches
Yale University alumni
Sportspeople from Holyoke, Massachusetts
Deaths from cancer in Minnesota
Deaths from liver cancer